Buddy and Sweets is a jazz album recorded in Los Angeles, California in September 1955 by Harry "Sweets" Edison and Buddy Rich.

Track listing
LP side A
 "Yellow Rose of Brooklyn" (Harry "Sweets" Edison) – 4:31
 "Easy Does It" (Sy Oliver, Trummy Young) – 8:16
 "All Sweets" (Edison) – 2:09
 "Nice Work If You Can Get It" (George Gershwin, Ira Gershwin) – 4:04
LP side B
 "Barney's Bugle" (Buddy Rich) – 9:39
 "Now's the Time" (Charlie Parker) – 4:39
 "You're Getting to Be a Habit with Me" (Al Dubin, Harry Warren) – 5:10

Personnel
 Harry Sweets Edison – trumpet
 Buddy Rich – drums
 Jimmy Rowles – piano
 Barney Kessel – guitar
 John Simmons – bass

References / notes

 Norgran MGN 1038, also re-issued as Verve MGV 8129
Buddy and Sweets (Norgran MGN 1038) at jazzdisco.org
Buddy and Sweets at [ allmusic.com]
Personnel and recording dates at mosaicrecords.com

External links
 Fitzpatrick, Craig, Stereotimes review of Buddy and Sweets, 2004 November (link)

1955 albums
Harry Edison albums
Buddy Rich albums
Albums produced by Norman Granz
Albums with cover art by David Stone Martin
Norgran Records albums
Verve Records albums